Brian Vernel (born 29 December 1990) is a Scottish  actor best known for his film role in Star Wars: The Force Awakens and as the character Odda the Younger in the TV series The Last Kingdom and Billy Wallace in Gangs of London.

Early life
A native of Glasgow, Vernel attended St Mungo's Academy in Gallowgate before training at the Royal Conservatoire of Scotland (formerly the Royal Scottish Academy of Music and Drama) after a one-year general arts foundation course at Glasgow University.

Career
He played the role of Bala-Tik in the 2015 film Star Wars: The Force Awakens.  Vernel's character spoke in a Glaswegian accent.

Filmography

Movies

Television

Stage
The Seagull (2017) playing Konstantin at the Lyric Theatre (Hammersmith)
Barbarians (2015) playing Paul at the Young Vic
Future Conditional (2015) at the Old Vic 
The Static (2012) playing Sparky at the Underbelly, Edinburgh - Nominated for Best Actor The Stage Awards for Acting Excellence at the Edinburgh Fringe
Macbeth (2012) playing Macbeth at the Royal Conservatoire of Scotland

References

External links

Living people
1991 births
Scottish male film actors
Scottish male stage actors
Scottish male television actors
Male actors from Glasgow
People from Bridgeton, Glasgow
Alumni of the Royal Conservatoire of Scotland
21st-century Scottish male actors
Alumni of the University of Glasgow
People educated at St Mungo's Academy